The Auckland Islands, in New Zealand's subantarctic islands, are a volcanic archipelago. The main island, Auckland Island, is heavily indented with a series of inlets, especially on its east coast. The most prominent inlet is Carnley Harbour, which separates the main island from Adams Island to the south.

The following is a list of inlets, deep narrow bays, and other natural harbours in the Auckland Islands. The inlets are listed in geographical order, clockwise from the northwestern tip of Auckland Island, North West Cape.

North coast, Auckland Island
North Harbour
Matheson Bay
Port Ross

East coast, Auckland Island
Haskell Bay
Chambres Inlet
Musgrave Inlet
Smith Harbour
Norman Inlet
Hansfield Inlet
Deep Inlet
Worth Inlet
McLennan Inlet
Waterfall Inlet

South coast, Auckland Island
Carnley Harbour (Adams Straits)
Tagua Bay
North Arm
Musgrave Bay
Coleridge Bay
Western Arm

Adams Island (clockwise from northwesternmost point)
Magnetic Bay
Bolton's Bay
Fly Harbour

Landforms of the Auckland Islands
Auckland Islands
New Zealand-related lists